Ismaël Gharbi Álvarez (born 10 April 2004) is a professional footballer who plays as a midfielder for Ligue 1 club Paris Saint-Germain. Born in France, he represents Spain at youth international level.

Club career 
Gharbi began his career at Paris FC in 2010, and joined the Paris Saint-Germain Academy in 2016. In 2020, he was part of the PSG team that participated at the Alkass International Cup in Qatar, finishing in third place. He scored 5 goals across the tournament; a brace against Kashiwa Reysol in the group stage, a goal against Zenit Saint Petersburg in the quarter-finals, one against Inter Milan in the semi-finals, and another against the Mohammed VI Academy in the third place match.

In April 2021, Gharbi was included in the Paris Saint-Germain (PSG) squad for the UEFA Champions League quarter-final first leg against Bayern Munich, an eventual 3–2 victory for Les Parisiens at the Allianz Arena. On 14 July 2021, he scored a goal in his first appearance for PSG's senior team, a 4–0 friendly victory over Le Mans at the Camp des Loges. On 1 August 2021, Gharbi made his professional debut, coming on as a substitute in a 1–0 Trophée des Champions loss to Lille. His Coupe de France debut came on 19 December in a 3–0 win over Feignies Aulnoye. On 8 May 2022, Gharbi made his first-ever Ligue 1 appearance, coming on as a substitute in a 2–2 draw with Troyes at the Parc des Princes. He signed his first professional contract with Paris Saint-Germain on 17 June, a three-year deal until 30 June 2025.

International career 
Gharbi was born in France to a Tunisian father and Spanish mother, and is therefore eligible to represent France, Spain, and Tunisia. He has been called up by the France under-17s in the past. The Tunisian Football Federation has previously made efforts to convince Gharbi to represent Tunisia. In 2021, he was called up to play for the France under-18s for the Tournoi International de Limoges. In February 2022, Gharbi was called up to the Spain under-18s. In June, he represented Spain at the 2022 Mediterranean Games in Oran, Algeria.

Style of play 
Gharbi is a versatile player; although primarily an attacking midfielder, he can also play as a wide and central midfielder. Hervé Guégan, who coached Gharbi at the Alkass International Cup in 2020, has stated that he is a player "technically at ease" and that he "always makes passes with good timing." Gharbi is good at free kicks and possesses good ball control. While being able to score himself, he has an ability to make others score. In February 2022, former PSG player Mathieu Bodmer commented that "in the penalty area, time stops for [Gharbi]" and that he has "cold blood", being able to complete movements at the right moments.

Career statistics

Honours
Paris Saint-Germain
Ligue 1: 2021–22

References

External links 
 Paris Saint-Germain F.C. profile

 
 

2004 births
Living people
Footballers from Paris
Spanish footballers
Spain youth international footballers
French footballers
France youth international footballers
Spanish people of Tunisian descent
Spanish sportspeople of African descent
French people of Spanish descent
Sportspeople of Spanish descent
French sportspeople of Tunisian descent
Association football midfielders
Paris FC players
Paris Saint-Germain F.C. players
Championnat National 3 players
Ligue 1 players